Asnnel Robo (born November 4, 1993) is a professional gridiron football fullback for the Stuttgart Surge of the European League of Football.

Early life
Robo was born in Cayenne, French Guiana and later moved to France. After playing soccer in his youth, he began playing gridiron football when he was 18 years old while he was studying in Marseille.

University career
After moving to Canada, Robo played U Sports football as a running back for the Montreal Carabins from 2015 to 2018. Over his four year career, he had 677 rushing yards and six touchdowns, including 145 rushing yards in a single game against Concordia in his senior year.

Professional career

Montreal Alouettes
Robo qualified for the Canadian Football League's first ever Global Draft in 2019 as the league wanted to expand its international reach. He was then drafted third overall by the Montreal Alouettes and signed with the team on May 15, 2019. However, he was released at the end of training camp on June 9, 2019.

Calgary Stampeders
On June 11, 2019, Robo was signed by the Calgary Stampeders to their practice roster. He played in his first career game against the Edmonton Eskimos on September 2, 2019, in the Labour Day Classic. He played in two more games that year, but did not record any statistics. 

Robo was re-signed by the Stampeders in the following off-season on November 26, 2019. However, he did not play in 2020 due to the cancellation of the 2020 CFL season and was released on February 3, 2021.

Toronto Argonauts
Shortly after his release from the Stampeders, it was announced on February 6, 2021, that Robo had signed with the Toronto Argonauts. He played in 12 regular season games where he had three special teams tackles. He spent part of 2022 training camp with the team, but was released after the first pre-season game on May 29, 2022.

Stuttgart Surge 
In 2022, Robo joined the Stuttgart Surge for the European League of Football 2023 season.

References

External links
 Toronto Argonauts bio

1993 births
Living people
Calgary Stampeders players
Canadian football fullbacks
French players of Canadian football
Montreal Alouettes players
Montreal Carabins football players
Toronto Argonauts players
Expatriate players of American football
French expatriate basketball people in Germany
Stuttgart Surge players